Bouaflé Department is a department of Marahoué Region in Sassandra-Marahoué District, Ivory Coast. In 2021, its population was 300,305 and its seat is the settlement of Bouaflé. The sub-prefectures of the department are Bégbessou, Bonon, Bouaflé, N'Douffoukankro, Pakouabo, Tibéita, and Zaguiéta.

History

Bouaflé Department was created in 1969 as one of the 24 new departments that were created to take the place of the six departments that were being abolished. It was created from territory that was formerly part of Centre Department. Using current boundaries as a reference, the department occupied the same territory that is today Marahoué Region.

In 1980, Bouaflé Department was divided to create Zuénoula Department. What remained was divided again in 1988 to create Sinfra Department.

In 1997, regions were introduced as new first-level subdivisions of Ivory Coast; as a result, all departments were converted into second-level subdivisions. Bouaflé Department was included as part of Marahoué Region.

In 2011, districts were introduced as new first-level subdivisions of Ivory Coast. At the same time, regions were reorganised and became second-level subdivisions and all departments were converted into third-level subdivisions. At this time, Bouaflé Department remained part of the retained Marahoué Region in the new Sassandra-Marahoué District.

Notes

References
"Monographie de Bouaflé, un département aux énormes potentialités économiques, sociales et culturelles", abidjan.net, 13 January 2015.

Departments of Marahoué
1969 establishments in Ivory Coast
States and territories established in 1969